Tabanocella is a genus of horse flies in the family Tabanidae.

Species
Tabanocella alveolata (Surcouf, 1909)
Tabanocella denticornis (Wiedemann, 1828)
Tabanocella fenestrata (Séguy, 1934)
Tabanocella innotata (Karsch, 1888)
Tabanocella longirostris (Bigot, 1859)
Tabanocella maculata (Surcouf, 1909)
Tabanocella perpulcra (Austen, 1910)
Tabanocella stigmatana (Séguy, 1934)
Tabanocella stimulans (Austen, 1910)
Tabanocella umbraticola (Austen, 1911)
Tabanocella zoulouensis (Ricardo, 1914)
Tabanocella mordosa (Austen, 1912)
Tabanocella bilineata Oldroyd, 1957
Tabanocella bimaculata Zeegers, 2017
Tabanocella conciliatrix Dias, 1960
Tabanocella concinna (Austen, 1910)
Tabanocella grenieri Dias, 1956
Tabanocella guineensis Dias, 1959
Tabanocella hauseri Zeegers, 2017
Tabanocella immaculata Oldroyd, 1957
Tabanocella metallica Oldroyd, 1957
Tabanocella micromera Oldroyd, 1963
Tabanocella natalensis Oldroyd, 1957
Tabanocella oldroydi Grenier & Rageau, 1955
Tabanocella paulyi Leclercq, 1988
Tabanocella quentini Zeegers, 2017
Tabanocella schofieldi Usher, 1965
Tabanocella schoutedeni Fain, 1947
Tabanocella scirpea Oldroyd, 1957
Tabanocella seguyi (Quentin, 1990)
Tabanocella seyrigi Séguy, 1951
Tabanocella sinuata Oldroyd, 1957
Tabanocella stuckenbergi Oldroyd, 1957
Tabanocella thoracica Séguy, 1951
Tabanocella viettei (Quentin, 1990)

References

Brachycera genera
Tabanidae
Diptera of Africa
Taxa named by Jacques-Marie-Frangile Bigot